The 2014 Queensland Cup season was the 19th season of Queensland's top-level statewide rugby league competition run by the Queensland Rugby League. The competition, known as the Intrust Super Cup due to sponsorship from Intrust Super, featured 13 teams playing a 30-week long season (including finals) from March to September.

The Northern Pride won their second premiership after defeating the Easts Tigers 36–4 in the Grand Final at Suncorp Stadium. Souths Logan Magpies'  Luke Page was named the competition's Player of the Year, winning the Courier Mail Medal.

Teams
In 2014, the competition expanded to the 13 teams with the inclusion of the PNG Hunters. The Hunters are the first Papua New Guinea-based club to play in the Queensland Cup since the Port Moresby Vipers, who took part in the 1996 and 1997 seasons. The Sunshine Coast Sea Eagles returned to their original name, the Sunshine Coast Falcons, and returned to their usual black and gold colour scheme.

The Canberra Raiders re-introduced their affiliation with the Souths Logan Magpies for the 2014 season.

Ladder

Regular season

The 2014 Queensland Cup regular season featured 26 rounds, with each team playing 24 games and receiving two byes.

Final series

Grand Final

The Northern Pride dominated the regular season, winning 16 games as they won their second consecutive minor premiership. They defeated Easts 8–7 in the major semi final to qualify for their third Grand Final. Easts, who finished third, defeated Wynnum Manly in the first week of the finals before their one-point loss to the Pride. A week later, they again faced Wynnum Manly, winning 30–12 to qualify for their second consecutive Grand Final and their fourth overall.

First half
The Northern Pride opened the scoring in the 15th minute when centre Kyle Feldt crossed after a set play to the right. They added another try five minutes later when Hezron Murgha sent Javid Bowen over with a short ball. They went into the half time break with an 18–0 lead after Davin Crampton scored next to the posts in the 35th minute.

Second half
The Pride started the second half as they ended the first, when Shaun Nona caught his own rebounded kick and found his captain Brett Anderson, who scored in the corner. The lead jumped to 30 in the 51st minute when Ryan Ghietti scored thanks to a Blake Leary line break. After 65 minutes, the Tigers finally got on the scoreboard after winger Jarrod McInally scored a consolation try. The Pride wrapped up the win with their sixth try of the game, after Bowen crossed out wide for his second in the 79th minute. Shaun Nona converted to bring the final score to 36–4, the biggest winning margin in a Queensland Cup Grand Final (as of 2019). Nona was awarded the Duncan Hall Medal for man of the match.

North Queensland Cowboys-contracted Pride players Kyle Feldt and Ethan Lowe would go onto to play in the Cowboys' 2015 NRL Grand Final win over the Brisbane Broncos, while Pride head coach Jason Demetriou joined the Cowboys as an assistant coach in 2015 and was on the coaching staff for the Grand Final win.

NRL State Championship

After winning the Grand Final, the Northern Pride qualified for the inaugural NRL State Championship on NRL Grand Final day. They defeated the Penrith Panthers 32–28.

Player statistics

Leading try scorers

Leading point scorers

End-of-season awards
 Courier Mail Medal (Best and Fairest): Luke Page ( Souths Logan Magpies)
 Coach of the Year: Jon Buchanan ( Wynnum Manly Seagulls)
 Rookie of the Year: Garry Lo ( PNG Hunters)
 Representative Player of the Year: Blake Leary ( Queensland Residents,  Northern Pride)
 XXXX People's Choice Award: Willie Minoga ( PNG Hunters)

See also

 Queensland Cup
 Queensland Rugby League

References

2014 in Australian rugby league
Queensland Cup